Larkin Building may refer to:

Larkin Company Building, an eight story building in Chicago, built in 1912 and demolished in 2020
Larkin Administration Building, a building designed by Frank Lloyd Wright in Buffalo, New York, demolished in 1950
Larkin Terminal Warehouse, a building in Buffalo, New York, built in 1912
Larkin–Belber Building, a historic building in the Logan Square neighborhood of Philadelphia
Larkin Building (New York City), a skyscraper in New York City that was proposed in 1926 but was never built